Clifford Hardman "Clive" Brook (1 June 1887 – 17 November 1974) was an English film actor.

After making his first screen appearance in 1920, Brook emerged as a leading British actor in the early 1920s. After moving to the United States in 1924, Brook became one of the major stars for Paramount Pictures in the late silent era. During 1928–29 he successfully made the transition to sound and continued to be featured in many of Hollywood's most prestigious films, including a number of literary adaptations. In the mid-1930s he returned to England, where he appeared regularly in leading film roles for a further decade.

Early life
Brook was born in Islington, London, the son of George Alfred Brook and Charlotte Mary Brook. He attended Dulwich College because of his father's desire for him to be a lawyer, but family financial problems caused him to leave at age 15. He then studied elocution at a polytechnic.

He served in the Artists' Rifles in the First World War, rising to the rank of Major.

Before Brook went into acting, he worked as a journalist and an insurance clerk. He first appeared on stage in 1918 and also in films from 1919. He worked first in British films then in Hollywood.

Hollywood

Brook debuted on film in Trent's Last Case (1920). He was memorable in Josef von Sternberg's Underworld (1927) as an alcoholic ex-lawyer who is taken under the wing of a professional thief. Von Sternberg later featured him in one of Brook's best remembered appearances, playing opposite Marlene Dietrich in Shanghai Express (1932). He played Sherlock Holmes three times: The Return of Sherlock Holmes and Sherlock Holmes (in that order), and as part of an anthology film, Paramount on Parade (1930).

In 1934 he was voted one of the most popular stars at the British box office.

At the end of his career, Brook appeared in a number of British television dramas, notably in the "ITV Play of the Week" strand on the fledgling Independent Television  commercial channel. He returned to film one last time in The List of Adrian Messenger (1963).

Return to England
Brook returned to England in 1935 because of kidnapping threats toward his children. In 1943, he adapted the comedy On Approval by Frederick Lonsdale and wrote, produced, directed and starred in the film with Beatrice Lillie, Googie Withers and Roland Culver. The costumes were by Cecil Beaton.

In 1949 he presented the radio series The Secrets of Scotland Yard.  In 1956 he appeared on stage in One Bright Day at the Apollo Theatre in London.

Broadway
Brook starred as Josiah Bolton in the comedy Second Threshold from 2 January 1951 until 21 April 1951.

Death
Brook died 17 November 1974 in Ealing, London.

Family
In 1920, Brook married Charlotte Elisabeth Mildred Evelyn. Their children, Faith and  Lyndon, were also actors.

Complete filmography

 Trent's Last Case (1920) - John Marlow
 Kissing Cup's Race (1920) - Lord Rattlington
 Her Penalty (1921) - Robert Trenchard
 The Loudwater Mystery (1921) - Lord Loudwater
 Daniel Deronda (1921) - Mallinger Grandcourt
 A Sportsman's Wife (1921) - Dick Anderson
 Sonia (1921) - David O'Raine
 Christie Johnstone (1921) - Astral Hither
 Vanity Fair (1922, Short) - Rawdon Crawley
 The Sheik (1922, Short) - The Sheik
 A Tale of Two Cities (1922, Short) - Sydney Carton
 Shirley (1922) - Robert Moore
 Married to a Mormon (1922) - Lionel Daventry
 Stable Companions (1922) - James Pilkington
 Rigoletto (1922, Short) - Duke of Mantua
 La traviata (1922, Short) - Alfred Germont
 The Parson's Fight (1922, Short) - Parson
 Sir Rupert's Wife (1922, Short) - Sir Rupert Leigh
 The Experiment (1922) - Vivian Caryll
 Tense Moments with Great Authors (1922) - Rawdon Crawley (segment "Vanity Fair") / Sydney Carton (segment "Tale of Two Cities, A")
 Tense Moments from Opera (1922) - Duke of Mantna / Alfred Germont (segments "Rigoletto", "La Traviata")
 Love and a Whirlwind (1922) - Grifftih
 A Debt of Honour (1922) - Walter Hyde
 Through Fire and Water (1923) - John Dryden
 This Freedom (1923) - Harry Occleve
 Out to Win (1923) - Barraclough / Altar
 The Royal Oak (1923) - Dorian Clavering
 The Reverse of the Medal (1923, Short) - General
 Woman to Woman (1923) - David Compton / David Anson-Pond
 The Money Habit (1924) - Noel Jason
 The Recoil (1924) - Marchmont
 The White Shadow (1924) - Robin Field
 The Wine of Life (1924) - Michael Strong
 The Passionate Adventure (1924) - Adrien St. Clair
 Christine of the Hungry Heart (1924) - Dr. Alan Monteagle
 Human Desires (1924) - Georges Gautier
 The Mirage (1924) - Henry Galt
 Declassée (1925) - Rudolph Solomon
 Enticement (1925) - Henry Wallis
 Playing with Souls (1925) - Matthew Dale Sr.
 If Marriage Fails (1925) - Joe Woodbury
 The Woman Hater (1925) - Miles - the Woman-hater
 The Home Maker (1925) - Lester Knapp
 Compromise (1925) - Alan Tahyer
 Seven Sinners (1925) - Jerry Winters
 Pleasure Buyers (1925) - Tad Workman
 When Love Grows Cold (1926) - Jerry Benson
 Three Faces East (1926) - Valdar
 Why Girls Go Back Home (1926) - Clifford Dudley
 You Never Know Women (1926) - Norodin
 For Alimony Only (1926) - Peter Williams
 The Popular Sin (1926) - Jean Corot
 Afraid to Love (1927) - Sir Reginald Belsize
 Barbed Wire (1927) - Oskar Muller
 Underworld (1927) - Rolls-Royce Wensel
 Hula (1927) - Anthony Haldane
 The Devil Dancer (1927) - Stephen Athelstan
 French Dressing, aka Lessons for Wives (1927) - Henri de Briac
 Midnight Madness (1928) - Michael Bream
 Yellow Lily (1928) - Archduke Alexander
 The Perfect Crime (1928) - Benson
 Forgotten Faces (1928) - Heliotrope Harry Harlow
 Interference (1928) - Sir John Marlay
 A Dangerous Woman (1929) - Frank Gregory
 The Four Feathers (1929) - Lt. Jack Durrance
 Charming Sinners (1929) - Robert Miles
 The Return of Sherlock Holmes (1929) - Sherlock Holmes
 The Marriage Playground (1929) - On-Screen Trailer Host and Narrator (uncredited)
 The Laughing Lady (1929) - Daniel Farr
 Slightly Scarlet (1930) - Hon. Courtenay Parkes
 Paramount on Parade (1930) - Sherlock Holmes (Murder Will Out)
 Sweethearts and Wives (1930) - Reginald De Brett
 Anybody's Woman (1930) - Neil Dunlap
 Scandal Sheet (1931) - Noel Adams
 East Lynne (1931) - Capt. William Levison
 Tarnished Lady (1931) - Norman Cravath
 The Lawyer's Secret (1931) - Drake Norris
 Silence (1931) - Jim Warren
 24 Hours (1931) - Jim Towner
 Husband's Holiday (1931) - George Boyd
 Shanghai Express (1932) - Captain Donald Harvey
 The Man from Yesterday (1932) - Captain Tony Clyde
 Make Me a Star (1932) - Himself (uncredited)
 The Night of June 13 (1932) - John Curry
 Sherlock Holmes (1932) - Sherlock Holmes
 Cavalcade (1933) - Robert Marryot
 Midnight Club (1933) - Colin Grant
 If I Were Free (1933) - Gordon Evers
 Gallant Lady (1934) - Dan Pritchard
 Where Sinners Meet (1934) - Mr. Latimer
 Let's Try Again (1934) - Dr. Jack Overton
 The Dictator (1935) - Dr. Friedrich Struensee
 Dressed to Thrill (1935) - Bill Trent
 Love in Exile (1936) - King Regis VI
 Lonely Road (1936) - Malcolm Stevenson
 Action for Slander (1937) - Maj. George Daviot
 The Ware Case (1938) - Sir Hubert Ware
 Return to Yesterday (1940) - Robert Maine
 Convoy (1940) - Captain Armitage
 Freedom Radio (1941) - Karl
 Breach of Promise (1942) - Peter Conroy
 The Flemish Farm (1943) - Maj. Lessart
 The Shipbuilders (1943) - Leslie Pagan
 On Approval (1944, also director, producer and screenwriter) - George, 10th Duke of Bristol
 The List of Adrian Messenger (1963) - Marquis of Gleneyre

References

Bibliography
 Scott, Ian. From Pinewood to Hollywood: British Filmmakers in American Cinema, 1910–1969''. Palgrave MacMillan, 2010.

External links

Photographs of Clive Brook

1887 births
1974 deaths
People from Islington (district)
Male actors from London
English male stage actors
English male silent film actors
English male film actors
20th-century English male actors
Artists' Rifles officers
British Army personnel of World War I
People educated at Dulwich College
British expatriate male actors in the United States
Paramount Pictures contract players